Mohan Kumar (1 June 1934 – 10 November 2017) was an Indian film director, producer and screenwriter, who worked in the Bollywood (Hindi) film industry of India. He was born in Sialkot in British India; after Partition, he moved to India and settled down in Bombay.

Filmography as director
1961 -Aas Ka Panchhi
1962 -Anpadh
1964 -Ayee Milan Ki Bela
1964 -Aap Ki Parchhaiyan
1967 -Aman
1969 -Anjaana
1971 -Aap Aye Bahaar Ayee
1972 -Mome Ki Gudiya
1974 - Amir Garib
1976 -Aap Beati
1980 -Aap To Aise Na The
1983 -Avtaar
1984 -All Rounder
1986 -Amrit
1990 -Amba

References

External links
 * 

1934 births
2017 deaths
Hindi-language film directors
People from Sialkot
Indian male screenwriters
Hindi film producers
20th-century Indian film directors
Film directors from Mumbai